Mayman is a surname. Notable people with the surname include:

 William "Bill" Mayman (1887–1970), Australian rules footballer
 Jan Mayman (died 2021), Australian journalist
 Martin Mayman (1924–1999), American psychologist
 Pauline Mayman (1928–1989), British rally car driver
 Scott Mayman, Australian radio presenter